Pankaj Kumar Malik is an Indian politician and member of the 18th Legislative Assembly of Uttar Pradesh. Malik represented the Charthawal constituency of Uttar Pradesh and is a member of the Samajwadi Party.

Early life and education
Malik was born in Muzaffarnagar, Uttar Pradesh, India in 1978. He holds a LL.B. degree from D.A.V. College, Muzaffarnagar. Prior to joining politics, he was an agriculturist by profession.

Political career
Malik started his political career in Baghra by election 2004 where he was defeated by Rashtriya Lok Dal candidate Paramjeet Singh Malik by 3701 votes. He has been a MLA for two straight terms from 2007 to 2017. He represented Baghra (Assembly constituency) in 15th legislative assembly and Shamli (Assembly constituency) in 16th legislative assembly. Currently he is a member of the Samajwadi Party and MLA from Charthawal (Assembly constituency).

Posts Held

See also

 Indian National Congress
 Politics of India
 Shamli (Assembly constituency)
 Sixteenth Legislative Assembly of Uttar Pradesh
 Uttar Pradesh Legislative Assembly

References

Elections contested

People from Shamli district
1978 births
Indian National Congress politicians
Living people
Uttar Pradesh MLAs 2012–2017
Samajwadi Party politicians